Arūnas Čiplys (born 1 July 1967) is a Lithuanian professional darts player and former tennis player.

Čiplys has dominated the darts circuit in Lithuania and the Baltic states. He has won the Lithuanian national championship eight times.

References

External links

1967 births
Living people
Lithuanian darts players
People from Mažeikiai
British Darts Organisation players